= Geological museum in Kraków =

Coordinates: 50.057714°N 19.936554°E

Geological Museum, Kraków
- Muzeum Geologiczne Instytutu Nauk Geologicznych PAN
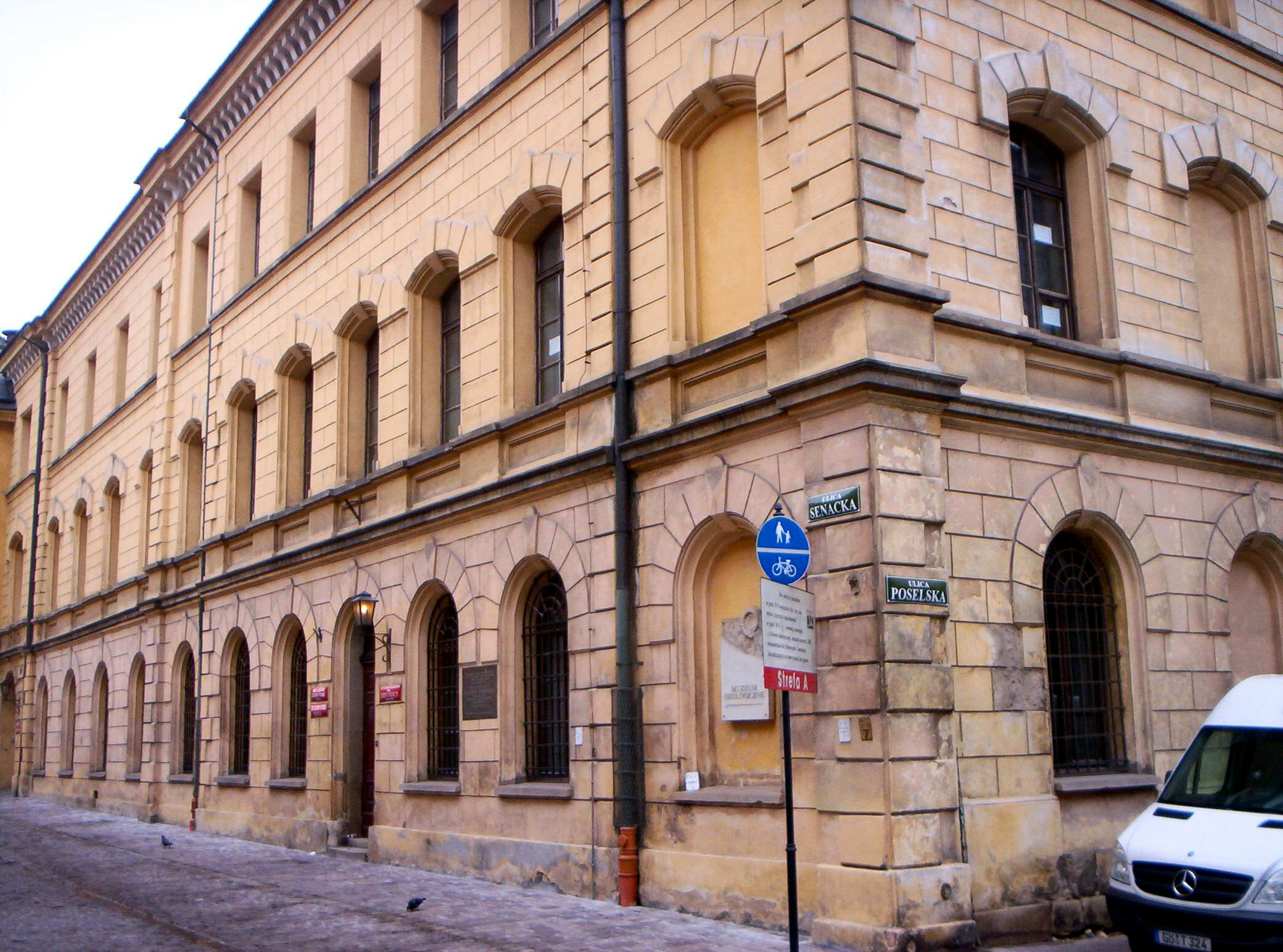
- Location: Senacka 3, 31-002 Kraków, Poland
- Type: Natural history museum
- Collections: Paleontology, paleobotany, mineralogy, lithology

Muzeum Geologiczne Instytutu Nauk Geologicznych PAN w Krakowie is a museum in Kraków, Poland. The collection dates back to 1865.
